Qaravol or Qarawal, also rendered as Qara Wul may refer to:
 Qaravol, Golestan
 Qaravol, Kurdistan